Survivors' Club is a comic book series created by writers Lauren Beukes and Dale Halvorsen, and artist Ryan Kelly, published by the Vertigo imprint of DC Comics, beginning in 2015. The series is set in a world where the archetypal characters from 1980s horror movies are real. The titular "Survivors' Club" is made up of those would-be victims who managed to escape. The series ran monthly for nine issues until 2016.

Publication history 
The first issue of Survivors' Club was released by Vertigo Comics, an imprint of DC Comics, in October 2015. The series ran for nine issues until June 2016. The complete series was compiled as a graphic novel, which was released in September 2016.

Characters 
 Chenzira Moleko 
 Teo Reyes 
 Kiri Nomura 
 Simon Wickman 
 Alice Taylor-Newsome 
 Harvey Lisker

Cancelled television adaptation 
In November 2018, a television series based on Survivors' Club was in development at The CW from Warner Bros. Television. Jared Frieder and Len Goldstein were attached to the potential drama series as executive producers, with the former also set to write the pilot script. The longline for the project read:

The script was not picked up to pilot by The CW for the 2019–2020 television season and no further development updates have been announced.

References 

2015 in comics
2015 comics debuts
2016 in comics
2016 comics endings
Vertigo Comics titles
DC Comics titles
Horror comics
Horror fiction